The 8-inch gun M1 was a 203 mm towed heavy gun developed in the United States. At 32,584 m (35,635 yd), it had the longest range of any US Army field artillery weapon in World War II.  It was also used in small numbers by the British Army.

Development and production

In 1919, the Westervelt Board described the ideal heavy gun for future development having a bore of 194 mm to 8 inches, a projectile of about 200 lbs in weight, and a range of 35,000 yards. More striking was the requirement that it be road transportable. At this time no other country had such a road-transportable field gun. Low-priority design work occurred until 1924. The gun used the same projectile as the 8-inch coastal gun and the US Navy's 8-inch cruiser gun. Using the same carriage as the 240 mm howitzer M1 eased development, but the gun was very troublesome and was not standardized until January 1942. The main problems were excessive bore wear and poor accuracy, but it was felt that nothing better could be produced in a timely manner. Thus it entered production at a low rate and in small numbers. The gun tube was produced by Watervliet Arsenal, and the recoil system was produced by Hannifin Manufacturing. Watertown Arsenal, Bucyrus-Erie, and the S. Morgan Smith Company manufactured the carriage. Only 139 weapon systems were produced before production ceased in 1945.

In the quest for greater tactical mobility, the Ordnance Department experimented with a self-propelled version. Like the 240 mm howitzer, it was mounted on a stretched Heavy Tank T26E3 chassis that had an extra bogie wheel per side as the 8in Gun Motor Carriage T93, but the war ended before they could be used, and they were later scrapped.

Transport

One of the requirements during development was that the gun be easy to emplace.  Given the weight of the gun and carriage, this was a challenge.  Eventually, a pair of three-axle, six-wheeled transport wagons were developed – one for the barrel and recoil mechanism, and one for the carriage. These transport wagons were also used with the 240 mm howitzer. These were standardized as the M2 and M3. The M2 wagon carried the carriage and the M3 wagon carried the barrel and recoil system as shown to the left. This separate configuration required the use of the 20-ton M2 truck-mounted crane for setup. The crane also included a clam-shell bucket that was transported on a trailer and used to dig the recoil pit for the gun. In spite of the weight and being transported in two pieces, the gun could be emplaced in as little as two hours.

The transport wagons were initially intended to be towed by the Mack NO -ton heavy truck. Because the truck was a wheeled vehicle, it had problems in soft ground such as mud because its ground pressure was high. The M6 High Speed Tractor, a tracked vehicle which was explicitly designed for towing the 8-inch gun and 240 mm howitzer was standardized in June 1943 but would not enter production until February 1944, so the Ordnance Department improvised in the meantime. Surplus M3 Lee-based M31 and M32B1 tank recovery vehicles and M10A1 tank destroyers were quickly modified and tested. These proved to be satisfactory and were adopted for use as the M33, M34, and M35 Prime Movers, respectively.

Variants 
 8in Gun Motor Carriage T93 - prototype

Service
The gun was assigned to non-divisional battalions, eight of which were eventually organized, trained and equipped.  Each consisted of six guns, organized into three batteries of two gun sections each. Five battalions saw service in Europe or Italy (153rd, 243rd, 256th, 268th, and 575th) and three in the Pacific (570th, 573rd, and 780th).  They first saw action in Italy in April 1944 at the Anzio beachhead when Battery B of the 575th Field Artillery Battalion was attached to the 698th Field Artillery Battalion. Battery A of the 575th also went to the Cassino front attached to the 697th Field Artillery Battalion, and was used in the counter-battery role against long-range German 170 mm guns. By September 1944, the 8-inch guns of the 575th had been withdrawn from Italy, and soon saw action in Europe where they were particularly effective against fortified targets and in counter-battery fire against German long-range artillery.  At St. Malo, France, two battalions of 8-inch guns participated in the siege.  The 8-inch guns scored direct hits on the walls of the ancient citadel.  In the Siegfried Line campaign, the 8-inch guns, adjusted by aerial observers, knocked out two bridges over the Roer River.  At the end of the war, the battalions were deactivated and the guns moved into storage; however, they were never again used in action and eventually disposed.

Seventeen guns were supplied to Great Britain.

Ammunition 
The gun fired separate loading ammunition with two increments.  M9 Green Bag propellant was used for medium ranges and was preferred for improved accuracy and reduced barrel erosion.  M10 White Bag was used for long- and extreme-range firing.   Only two fuses were used: M51A3 point detonating (and delay), and M67A3 mechanical time. Range and muzzle velocity below are for maximum charge of M10 White Bag.

Existing examples
Only three examples are known to have survived. They are located at:
 45th Infantry Division Museum, Oklahoma City, Oklahoma
 US Army Artillery Museum, Fort Sill, Oklahoma
 US Army Ordnance Museum, Fort Lee, Virginia

See also
 List of U.S. Army weapons by supply catalog designation SNL D-33
 M6 Tractor
 M115 howitzer
 M110 howitzer

References

Bibliography 
 
 Hogg, Ian V. The Guns, 1939-45.  New York: Ballantine Books, 1970  
 Schreier Jr., Konrad F. – Standard guide to U.S. World War II Tanks & Artillery (1994) Krause Publications, .
 
 
 Technical Manual TM9-2300 Standard Artillery and fire Control Material. (dated February 1944)
 Technical Manual TM9-336 8-inch Gun M1 and Carriage M2.  War Dept. Nov. 1943
 Field Manual FM6-95 Service of the Piece 8-Inch Gun M! and 240-MM Howitzer M1. War Department. Feb 1946

External links

British Artillery in World War II
 United States. War Dept.. Service of the piece, 8-inch gun M1 and 240-MM howitzer M1.. Washington, D.C.. UNT Digital Library. Retrieved on 2012-08-17.

World War II artillery of the United States
World War II field artillery
203 mm artillery
Weapons and ammunition introduced in 1942